The Oakland Athletics' 2007 season was their first since 2004 in which they defended a title.  The A's were without Frank Thomas (Toronto) and ace Barry Zito (San Francisco), both players who the A's lost to free agency.  They filled the space left by Frank Thomas by signing free agent catcher Mike Piazza to a one-year contract worth $8.5 million to be the team's designated hitter.  They were also without Ken Macha, their former manager who was fired after four seasons with the team and replaced by Bob Geren, as well as third-base coach Ron Washington, who accepted the managerial position of the Texas Rangers. It was their first losing season since 1998.

Offseason
 December 6, 2006: Alan Embree was signed as a free agent with the Oakland Athletics.
 December 7, 2006: Jared Burton was drafted by the Cincinnati Reds from the Oakland Athletics in the 2006 rule 5 draft.
 February 5, 2007: Ricky Ledée signed as a free agent with the Oakland Athletics.

Regular season

Season standings

Record vs. opponents

Transactions

Roster

Game log

|- style="background-color:#ffbbbb"
| 1 || April 2 || @ Mariners || 4 – 0 || Hernández (1-0) || Haren (0-1) || || 46,003 || 0-1
|- style="background-color:#ffbbbb"
| 2 || April 3 || @ Mariners || 8 – 4 || Mateo (1-0) || Calero (0-1) || || 25,287 || 0-2
|- style="background-color:#bbffbb"
| 3 || April 4 || @ Mariners || 9 – 0 || Harden (1-0) || Batista (0-1) || || 22,816 || 1-2
|- style="background-color:#bbffbb"
| 4 || April 5 || @ Angels || 4 – 3 || Duchscherer (1-0) || Rodríguez (0-1) || Street (1) || 39,234 || 2-2
|- style="background-color:#ffbbbb"
| 5 || April 6 || @ Angels || 5 – 2 || Moseley (1-0) || Kennedy (0-1) || Rodríguez (3) || 43,534 || 2-3
|- style="background-color:#ffbbbb"
| 6 || April 7 || @ Angels || 2 – 1 || Lackey (2-0) || Haren (0-2) || Shields (1) || 44,007 || 2-4
|- style="background-color:#bbffbb"
| 7 || April 8 || @ Angels || 2 – 1 || Blanton (1-0) || Escobar (1-1) || Street (2) || 37,783 || 3-4
|- style="background-color:#ffbbbb"
| 8 || April 9 || White Sox || 4 – 1 || Contreras (1-1) || Harden (1-1) || || 35,077 || 3-5
|- style="background-color:#bbffbb"
| 9 || April 10 || White Sox || 2 – 1 || Street (1-0) || Jenks (1-1) || || 15,153 || 4-5
|- style="background-color:#ffbbbb"
| 10 || April 11 || White Sox || 6 – 3 || Aardsma (1-0) || Street (1-1) || Jenks (2) || 19,130 || 4-6
|- style="background-color:#bbffbb"
| 11 || April 13 || Yankees || 5 – 4  || Street (2-1) || Bruney (0-1) || || 35,077 || 5-6
|- style="background-color:#ffbbbb"
| 12 || April 14 || Yankees || 4 – 3  || Bruney (1-1) || DiNardo (0-1) || || 35,077 || 5-7
|- style="background-color:#bbffbb"
| 13 || April 15 || Yankees || 5 – 4 || Marshall (1-0) || Rivera (1-1) || || 35,077 || 6-7
|- style="background-color:#bbffbb"
| 14 || April 17 || Angels || 4 – 1 || Gaudin (1-0) || Weaver (0-1) || Street (3) || 20,174 || 7-7
|- style="background-color:#bbffbb"
| 15 || April 18 || Angels || 3 – 0 || Haren (1-2) || Lackey (2-2) || Street (4) || 17,322 || 8-7
|- style="background-color:#bbffbb"
| 16 || April 20 || @ Rangers || 16 – 4 || Blanton (2-0) || McCarthy (1-3) || || 29,782 || 9-7
|- style="background-color:#ffbbbb"
| 17 || April 21 || @ Rangers || 7 – 0 || Loe (1-0) || Kennedy (0-2) || || 42,945 || 9-8
|- style="background-color:#ffbbbb"
| 18 || April 22 || @ Rangers || 4 – 3 || Eyre (1-0) || Duchscherer (1-1) || Otsuka (2) || 37,002 || 9-9
|- style="background-color:#bbffbb"
| 19 || April 23 || @ Orioles || 6 – 5 || Haren (2-2) || Bédard (3-2) || Street (5) || 13,862  || 10-9
|- style="background-color:#bbffbb"
| 20 || April 24 || @ Orioles || 4 – 2 || Braden (1-0) || Guthrie (1-1) || Street (6) || 14,452 || 11-9
|- style="background-color:#ffbbbb"
| 21 || April 25 || Mariners || 2 – 0 || Washburn (1-2) || Blanton (2-1) ||  || 19,674 || 11-10
|- style="background-color:#ffbbbb"
| 22 || April 26 || Mariners || 4 – 2 || Batista (2-2) || Calero (0-2) || Putz (2) || 14,683 || 11-11
|- style="background-color:#ffbbbb"
| 23 || April 27 || Devil Rays || 4 – 1 || Shields (2-0) || Gaudin (1-1) || Reyes (8) || 15,388 || 11-12
|- style="background-color:#bbffbb"
| 24 || April 28 || Devil Rays || 12 – 5 || Haren (3-2) || Fossum (2-2) || || 26,760 || 12-12
|- style="background-color:#ffbbbb"
| 25 || April 29 || Devil Rays || 5 – 3 || Kazmir (2-1) || Braden (1-1) || Reyes (9) || 23,827 || 12-13

|- style="background-color:#bbffbb"
| 26 || May 1 || @ Red Sox || 5 – 4  || Duchscherer (2-1) || Donnelly (0-1) || Street (7) || 37,052 || 13-13
|- style="background-color:#ffbbbb"
| 27 || May 2 || @ Red Sox || 6 – 4 || Beckett (6-0)|| Marshall (1-1) || Timlin (1) || 37,006 || 13-14
|- style="background-color:#bbffbb"
| 28 || May 4 || @ Devil Rays || 5 – 2 || Duchscherer (3-1) || Glover (0-2) || Street (8) || 11,546 || 14-14
|- style="background-color:#ffbbbb"
| 29 || May 5 || @ Devil Rays || 3 – 2  || Lugo (2-0) || Marshall (1-2) || || 16,604 || 14-15
|- style="background-color:#bbffbb"
| 30 || May 6 || @ Devil Rays || 5 – 3 || Blanton (3-1) || Jackson (0-5) || Street (9) || 16,880 || 15-15
|- style="background-color:#bbffbb"
| 31 || May 8 || @ Royals || 6 – 1 || Gaudin (2-1) || de la Rosa (3-3) || || 10,989 || 16-15
|- style="background-color:#ffbbbb"
| 32 || May 9 || @ Royals || 3 – 2 || Gobble (1-1) || Duchscherer (3-2) || Soria (6) || 10,974 || 16-16
|- style="background-color:#bbffbb"
| 33 || May 10 || @ Royals || 17 – 3 || Kennedy (1-2) || Hudson (0-1) || || 31,006 || 17-16
|- style="background-color:#bbffbb"
| 34 || May 11 || Indians || 8 – 2 || Blanton (4-1) || Sabathia (5-1) || || 20,393 || 18-16
|- style="background-color:#ffbbbb"
| 35 || May 12 || Indians || 6 – 3 || Carmona (4-1) ||Braden (1-2) || Borowski (12) || 22,705 || 18-17
|- style="background-color:#bbffbb"
| 36 || May 13 || Indians || 10 – 7 || Witasick (1-0) || Borowski (0-1) || || 24,692 || 19-17
|- style="background-color:#ffbbbb"
| 37 || May 14 || Royals || 2 – 1 || Gobble (2-1) || Duchscherer (3-3) || Soria (7) || 12,477 || 19-18
|- style="background-color:#bbffbb"
| 38 || May 15 || Royals || 5 – 4  || DiNardo (1-1) || Soria (1-2) || || 14,966 || 20-18
|- style="background-color:#ffbbbb"
| 39 || May 16 || Royals || 4 – 3 || Gobble (3-1) || Calero (0-3) || Riske (3) || 16,242 || 20-19
|- style="background-color:#ffbbbb"
| 40 || May 17 || Royals || 7 – 4 || Elarton (1-0) || Braden (1-3) || Soria (8) || 21,037 || 20-20
|- style="background-color:#bbffbb"
| 41 || May 18 || Giants || 15 – 3 || Gaudin (3-1) || Zito (3-5) || || 35,077 || 21-20
|- style="background-color:#bbffbb"
| 42 || May 19 || Giants || 4 – 2 || Haren (4-2) || Cain (2-4) || Embree (1) || 35,077 || 22-20
|- style="background-color:#ffbbbb"
| 43 || May 20 || Giants || 4 – 1 || Morris (5-1) || Kennedy (1-3) || || 35,077 || 22-21
|- style="background-color:#ffbbbb"
| 44 || May 21 || @ White Sox || 8 – 5 || Contreras (4-4) || Blanton (4-2) || Jenks (14) || 35,327 || 22-22
|- style="background-color:#ffbbbb"
| 45 || May 22 || @ White Sox || 10 – 4 || Danks (2-4) || Lewis (0-1) || || 34,122 || 22-23
|- style="background-color:#bbffbb"
| 46 || May 23 || @ White Sox || 4 – 0 || Gaudin (4-1) || Garland (3-3) || || || 23-23
|- style="background-color:#bbffbb"
| 47 || May 25 || @ Orioles || 3 - 2 || Haren (5-2) || Bédard (3-3) || Embree (2) || 30,382 || 24-23
|- style="background-color:#ffbbbb"
| 48 || May 26 || @ Orioles || 8 – 3 || Burres (2-2) || Kennedy (1-4) || || 29,194 || 24-24
|- style="background-color:#ffbbbb"
| 49 || May 27 || @ Orioles || 8 – 4 || Cabrera (4-5) || Blanton (4-3) ||  || 30,140 || 24-25
|- style="background-color:#bbffbb"
| 50 || May 28 || Rangers || 5 – 3 || Gaudin (5-1) || Tejeda (4-5)|| Embree (3) || 18,230 || 25-25
|- style="background-color:#ffbbbb"
| 51 || May 29 || Rangers || 4 – 0 || Wood (1-1) || DiNardo (1-2) || Gagné (3) || 18,006 || 25-26
|- style="background-color:#bbffbb"
| 52 || May 30 || Rangers || 6 – 1 || Haren (6-2) || Koronka (0-2) || || 25,674 || 26-26

|- style="background-color:#ffbbbb"
| 53 || June 1 || Twins || 3 – 2  || Neshek (3-0) || Calero (0-4) || Nathan (12) ||  20,219 || 26-27
|- style="background-color:#bbffbb"
| 54 || June 2 || Twins || 1 – 0 || Blanton (5-3) || Silva (3-6) || || 30,576 || 27-27
|- style="background-color:#bbffbb"
| 55 || June 3 || Twins || 4 – 2 || Gaudin (6-1) || Santana (6-5) || Embree (4) || 25,388 || 28-27
|- style="background-color:#bbffbb"
| 56 || June 4 || Red Sox || 5 – 4  || Castilla (1-0) || Snyder (1-1) || || 28,177  || 28-27
|- style="background-color:#bbffbb"
| 57 || June 5 || Red Sox || 2 – 0  || DiNardo (2-2) || Matsuzaka (7-3) || Embree (5) || 31,127 || 29-27
|- style="background-color:#bbffbb"
| 58 || June 6 || Red Sox || 3 – 2 || Kennedy (2-4) || Wakefield (5-7) || Casilla (1) || 32,280 || 30-27
|- style="background-color:#ffbbbb"
| 59 || June 7 || Red Sox || 1 – 0 || Schilling (6-2) || Blanton (5-4) || || 31,211 || 30-28
|- style="background-color:#bbffbb"
| 60 || June 8 || @ Giants || 5 – 3  || Calero (1-4) || Hennessey (1-2) || Embree (6) || 42,427 || 31-28
|- style="background-color:#bbffbb"
| 61 || June 9 || @ Giants || 6 – 0 || Haren (7-2) || Zito (6-6) || || 42,526 || 32-28
|- style="background-color:#bbffbb"
| 62 || June 10 || @ Giants || 2 – 0 || Casilla (2-0) || Cain (2-6) || || 42,345 || 33-28
|- style="background-color:#ffbbbb"
| 63 || June 12 || @ Astros || 5 – 4  || Borkowski (1-0) || Flores (0-1) || || 33,637 || 33-29
|- style="background-color:#bbffbb"
| 64 || June 13 || @ Astros || 7 – 3 || Blanton (6-4) || Wheeler (0-3) || || 34,611 || 34-29
|- style="background-color:#bbffbb"
| 65 || June 14 || @ Astros || 6 – 5  || Embree (1-0) || Moehler (0-2) || Casilla (2) || 42,024 || 35-29
|- style="background-color:#bbffbb"
| 66 || June 15 || Cardinals || 14 – 3 || Haren (8-2) || Looper (6-6) || || 24,241 || 36-29
|- style="background-color:#ffbbbb"
| 67 || June 16 || Cardinals || 15 – 6 || Springer (2-0) || DiNardo (2-3) || || 28,572 || 36-30
|- style="background-color:#ffbbbb"
| 68 || June 17 || Cardinals || 10 – 6 || Springer (3-0) || Lewis (0-2) || || 35,077 || 36-31
|- style="background-color:#bbffbb"
| 69 || June 18 || Reds || 6 – 1 || Blanton (7-4) || Lohse (3-9) || || 16,466 || 37-31
|- style="background-color:#ffbbbb"
| 70 || June 19 || Reds || 5 – 2 || Bailey (2-0) || Gaudin (6-2) || Weathers (14) || 19,351 || 37-32
|- style="background-color:#bbffbb"
| 71 || June 20 || Reds || 5 – 3 || Haren (9-2) || McBeth (1-1) || Embree (8) || 25,872 || 38-32
|- style="background-color:#ffbbbb"
| 72 || June 22 || @ Mets || 9 – 1 || Glavine (6-5) || DiNardo (2-4) || || 43,029 || 38-33
|- style="background-color:#ffbbbb"
| 73 || June 23 || @ Mets || 1 – 0 || Wagner (1-0) || Casilla (2-1) || || 52,920 || 38-34
|- style="background-color:#ffbbbb"
| 74 || June 24 || @ Mets || 10 – 2 || Maine (8-4) || Kennedy (2-5) || || 50,143 || 38-35
|- style="background-color:#ffbbbb"
| 75 || June 25 || @ Indians || 5 – 2 || Sabathia (11-2) || Gaudin (6-3) || || 17,737 || 38-36
|- style="background-color:#ffbbbb"
| 76 || June 26 || @ Indians || 8 – 5 || Betancourt (1-0) || Embree (1-1) || || 18,494 || 38-37
|- style="background-color:#bbffbb"
| 77 || June 27 || @ Indians || 13 – 2 || DiNardo (3-4) || Carmona (8-4) || || 18,614 || 40-37
|- style="background-color:#ffbbbb"
| 78 || June 28 || @ Indians || 4 – 3 || Byrd (7-3) || Flores (0-2) || Borowski (22) || 22,921 || 40-38
|- style="background-color:#ffbbbb"
| 79 || June 29 || @ Yankees || 2 – 1 || Mussina (4-5) || Kennedy (2-6) || Rivera (10) || 52,622 || 40-39
|- style="background-color:#bbffbb"
| 80 || June 30 || @ Yankees || 7 – 0 || Gaudin (7-3) || Igawa (2-2) || || 54,150 || 41-39

|- style="background-color:#bbffbb"
| 81 || July 1 || @ Yankees || 11 – 5 || Haren (10-2) || Pettitte (4-6) || || 54,266 || 42-39
|- style="background-color:#ffbbbb"
| 82 || July 2 || Blue Jays || 11 – 7 || Towers (4-5) || DiNardo (3-5) || || 13,281 || 42-40
|- style="background-color:#bbffbb"
| 83 || July 3 || Blue Jays || 3 – 1 || Blanton (8-4) || Litsch (1-3) || || 35,077 || 43-40
|- style="background-color:#ffbbbb"
| 84 || July 4 || Blue Jays || 10 – 3 || McGowan (5-4) || Kennedy (2-7) || || 26,566 || 43-41
|- style="background-color:#bbffbb"
| 85 || July 5 || Mariners || 3 – 2 || Gaudin (8-3) || Batista (8-7) || Embree (9) || 15,654 || 44-41
|- style="background-color:#ffbbbb"
| 86 || July 6 || Mariners || 7 – 1 || O'Flaherty (6-0) || Haren (10-3) || || 19,158 || 44-42
|- style="background-color:#ffbbbb"
| 87 || July 7 || Mariners || 4 – 0 || Hernández (5-4) || Harden (1-2) || || 29,225 || 44-43
|- style="background-color:#ffbbbb"
| 88 || July 8 || Mariners || 7 – 3 || Green (2-1) || Blanton (8-5) || || 27,059 || 44-44
|- style="background-color:#ffbbbb"
| 89 || July 12 || @ Twins || 6 – 2 || Baker (4-3) || Gaudin (8-4) || || 25,207 || 44-45
|- style="background-color:#ffbbbb"
| 90 || July 13 || @ Twins || 5 – 3 || Santana (11-6) || DiNardo (3-6) || Nathan (17) || 36,338 || 44-46
|- style="background-color:#ffbbbb"
| 91 || July 14 || @ Twins || 4 – 3 || Silva (6-10) || Blanton (8-6) || Nathan (18) || 36,066 || 44-47
|- style="background-color:#ffbbbb"
| 92 || July 15 || @ Twins || 4 – 3 || Neshek (4-1) || Kennedy (2-8) || || 36,737 || 44-48
|- style="background-color:#ffbbbb"
| 93 || July 16 || Rangers || 4-1 || Wright (3-2) || Braden (1-4) || Gagné (13) || 18,160 || 44-49
|- style="background-color:#ffbbbb"
| 94 || July 17 || Rangers || 11 – 4 || Eyre (3-3) || Gaudin (8-5) || Mahay (1) || 20,209 || 44-50
|- style="background-color:#bbffbb"
| 95 || July 18 || Rangers || 6 – 0 || DiNardo (4-6) || Millwood (6-8) || || 23,440 || 45-50
|- style="background-color:#ffbbbb"
| 96 || July 20 || Orioles || 6 – 1 || Bédard (9-4) || Blanton (8-7) || || 18,444 || 45-51
|- style="background-color:#bbffbb"
| 97 || July 21 || Orioles || 4 – 3 || Haren (11-3) || Trachsel (5-7) || Embree (10) || 30,828 || 46-51
|- style="background-color:#ffbbbb"
| 98 || July 22 || Orioles || 2 – 0 || Guthrie (6-3) || Braden (1-5) || Walker (1) || 25,552 || 46-52
|- style="background-color:#bbffbb"
| 99 || July 23 || @ Angels || 12 – 6 || Kennedy (3-8) || Colón (6-6)|| || 43,847 || 47-52
|- style="background-color:#bbffbb"
| 100 || July 24 || @ Angels || 4 – 3 || DiNardo (5-6) || Escobar (11-4) || Embree (11) || 43,784 || 48-52
|- style="background-color:#ffbbbb"
| 101 || July 25 || @ Angels || 7 – 6 || Rodríguez (4-2) || Kennedy (3-9) || || 44,252 || 48-53
|- style="background-color:#bbffbb"
| 102 || July 26 || @ Mariners || 6 – 2 || Haren (12-3) || Weaver (2-9) || || 34,250 || 49-53
|- style="background-color:#ffbbbb"
| 103 || July 27 || @ Mariners || 7 – 1 || Hernández (7-6) || Braden (1-6) || || 37,643 || 49-54
|- style="background-color:#ffbbbb"
| 104 || July 28 || @ Mariners || 4 – 3 || Ramírez (6-3) || Gaudin (8-6) || Putz (30) || 41,260 || 49-55
|- style="background-color:#ffbbbb"
| 105 || July 29 || @ Mariners || 14 – 10 || Green (4-1) || Street (2-2) || || 41,961 || 49-56
|- style="background-color:#ffbbbb"
| 106 || July 30 || Tigers || 5 – 2 || Tata (1-0) || Blanton (8-8) || Jones (28)|| 18,468 || 49-57
|- style="background-color:#bbffbb"
| 107 || July 31 || Tigers || 7 – 3 || Haren (13-3) || Verlander (11-4) || || 21,305 || 50-57

|- style="background-color:#bbffbb"
| 108 || August 1 || Tigers || 3 – 2 || Brown (1-0) || Robertson (6-9) || Embree (12) || 27,118 || 51-57
|- style="background-color:#ffbbbb"
| 109 || August 2 || Angels || 6 – 4 || Saunders (5-0) || Gaudin (8-7) || Rodríguez (26) || 21,654 || 51-58
|- style="background-color:#bbffbb"
| 110 || August 3 || Angels || 8 – 4 || Casilla (3-1) || Shields (3-4) || || 21,552 || 52-58
|- style="background-color:#bbffbb"
| 111 || August 4 || Angels || 2 – 1 || Blanton (9-8) || Escobar (11-6) || Embree (13) || 29,144 || 53-58
|- style="background-color:#ffbbbb"
| 112 || August 5 || Angels || 4 – 3 || Lackey (14-6) || Calero (1-5) || Rodríguez (27) || 26,782 ||  53-59
|- style="background-color:#bbffbb"
| 113 || August 6 || @ Rangers || 9 – 7  || Brown (2-0) || Eyre (3-5) || Calero (1) || 24,737 || 54-59
|- style="background-color:#ffbbbb"
| 114 || August 7 || @ Rangers || 8 – 6 || Gabbard (5-1) || Gaudin (8-8) || Wilson (3) || 25,122 || 54-60
|- style="background-color:#bbffbb"
| 115 || August 8 || @ Rangers || 6 – 3 || DiNardo (6-6) || Murray (0-1) || Embree (14) || 29,647 || 55-60
|- style="background-color:#bbffbb"
| 116 || August 10 || @ Tigers || 16 – 10 || Lugo (3-0) || McBride (1-1) || || 40,922 || 56-60
|- style="background-color:#ffbbbb"
| 117 || August 11 || @ Tigers || 5 – 2 || Verlander (12-4) || Haren (13-4) || Jones (31) || 42,016 || 56-61
|- style="background-color:#ffbbbb"
| 118 || August 12 || @ Tigers || 11 – 6 || Robertson (7-9) || Braden (1-7) || || 39,960 || 56-62
|- style="background-color:#bbffbb"
| 119 || August 13 || @ Tigers || 7 – 2 || Gaudin (9-8) || Durbin (7-5) || || 37,229 || 57-62
|- style="background-color:#bbffbb"
| 120 || August 14 || White Sox || 4 – 3 || DiNardo (7-6) || Garland (8-8) || Embree (15) || 24,082 || 58-62
|- style="background-color:#bbffbb"
| 121 || August 15 || White Sox || 3 – 2 || Blanton (10-8) || Buehrle (9-8)  || Street (10) || 25,295 || 59-62
|- style="background-color:#bbffbb"
| 122 || August 16 || White Sox || 8 – 5  || Lugo (4-0) || Thornton (3-4) || || 20,218 || 60-62
|- style="background-color:#ffbbbb"
| 123 || August 17 || Royals || 8 – 2 || Bannister (9-7) || Meyer (0-1) || || 18,185 || 60-63
|- style="background-color:#ffbbbb"
| 124 || August 18 || Royals || 7 – 3 || Pérez (8-11) || Gaudin (9-9) || || 24,638 || 60-64
|- style="background-color:#bbffbb"
| 125 || August 19 || Royals || 6 – 1 || DiNardo (8-6) || Davies (5-10) || || 26,445 || 61-64
|- style="background-color:#bbffbb"
| 126 || August 20 || @ Blue Jays || 6 – 4 || Blanton (11-8) || Marcum (10-5) || Street (11) || 27,193 || 62-64
|- style="background-color:#bbffbb"
| 127 || August 21 || @ Blue Jays || 6 – 4 || Haren (14-4) || Tallet (2-3) || Street (12) || 32,639 || 63-64
|- style="background-color:#bbffbb"
| 128 || August 22 || @ Blue Jays || 4 – 1 || Loaiza (1-0) || Burnett (7-7) || Embree (16) || 31,145 || 64-64
|- style="background-color:#bbffbb"
| 129 || August 23 || @ Devil Rays || 12 – 2 || Gaudin (10-9) || Hammel (1-4) || || 9,444 || 65-64
|- style="background-color:#ffbbbb"
| 130 || August 24 || @ Devil Rays || 12 – 2 || Shields (10-8) || DiNardo (8-7) || || 9,592 || 65-65
|- style="background-color:#ffbbbb"
| 131 || August 25 || @ Devil Rays || 14 – 3 || Kazmir (10-8) || Blanton (11-9) || || 18,163 || 65-66
|- style="background-color:#ffbbbb"
| 132 || August 26 || @ Devil Rays || 7 – 4  || Sonnanstine (3-9) || Haren (14-5)|| Reyes (20)|| 19,044 || 65-67
|- style="background-color:#ffbbbb"
| 133 || August 27 || Blue Jays || 6 – 2  || Accardo (3-3) || Embree (1-2) || || 18,092 || 65-68
|- style="background-color:#ffbbbb"
| 134 || August 28 || Blue Jays || 5 – 4 || Wolfe (3-1) || Brown (2-1) || Janssen (4) || 20,542 || 65-69
|- style="background-color:#bbffbb"
| 135 || August 29 || Blue Jays || 5 – 4  || Lugo (5-0) || Frasor (1-4) || || 16,015 || 66-69
|- style="background-color:#bbffbb"
| 136 || August 31 || Tigers || 5 – 4  || Street (3-2) || Zumaya (1-3) || || 27,250 || 67-69

|- style="background-color:#ffbbbb"
| 137 || September 1 || Tigers || 6 – 1 || Verlander (15-5) || Haren (14-6) || || 21,336 || 67-70
|- style="background-color:#bbffbb"
| 138 || September 2 || Tigers || 8 – 7  || Street (4-2) || Bazardo (0-1) || || 23,195 || 68-70
|- style="background-color:#ffbbbb"
| 139 || September 3 || @ Angels || 9 – 5 || Santana (6-12) || Gaudin (10-10) || || 39,164 || 68-71
|- style="background-color:#ffbbbb"
| 140 || September 4 || @ Angels || 4 – 3 || Weaver (11-6) || DiNardo (8-8) || Rodríguez (34) || 39,017 || 68-72
|- style="background-color:#bbffbb"
| 141 || September 5 || @ Angels || 6 – 2 || Blanton (12-9) || Saunders (7-3) || || 34,000 || 69-72
|- style="background-color:#ffbbbb"
| 142 || September 7 || @ Rangers || 5 – 3 || Vólquez (2-0) || Haren (14-7) || Benoit (4) || 22,318 || 69-73
|- style="background-color:#ffbbbb"
| 143 || September 8 || @ Rangers || 7 – 3 || Murray (1-1) || Gaudin (10-11) || || 32,476 || 69-74
|- style="background-color:#ffbbbb"
| 144 || September 9 || @ Rangers || 12 – 9 || White (1-0) || DiNardo (8-9) || || 25,054 || 69-75
|- style="background-color:#bbffbb"
| 145 || September 10 || @ Mariners || 9 – 3 || Blanton (13-9) || Ramírez (8-9) || Street (13) || 26,698 || 70-75
|- style="background-color:#bbffbb"
| 146 || September 11 || @ Mariners || 7 – 4 || Lugo (6-0) || Washburn (9-14) || Street (14) || 26,676 || 71-75
|- style="background-color:#ffbbbb"
| 147 || September 12 || @ Mariners || 6 – 5 || Putz (3-1) || Brown (2-2) || || 26,194 || 71-76
|- style="background-color:#bbffbb"
| 148 || September 13 || Rangers || 6 – 5 || Gaudin (11-11) || Millwood (9-12) || Street (15) || 16,240 || 72-76
|- style="background-color:#bbffbb"
| 149 || September 14 || Rangers || 11 – 9 || Brown (3-2) || Rheinecker (2-2) || Street (16) || 19,346 || 73-76
|- style="background-color:#bbffbb"
| 150 || September 15 || Rangers || 7 – 3 || Blanton (14-9) || McCarthy (5-10) || Embree (17) || 24,517 || 74-76
|- style="background-color:#ffbbbb"
| 151 || September 16 || Rangers || 11 – 9 || Rheinecker (3-2) || Brown (3-3) || Benoit (5) || 23,770 || 74-77
|- style="background-color:#ffbbbb"
| 152 || September 17 || Mariners || 4 – 0 || Batista (14-11) || Haren (14-8) || || 17,228 || 74-78
|- style="background-color:#ffbbbb"
| 153 || September 18 || Mariners || 8 – 7 || Weaver (7-12) || Gaudin (11-12) || Sherrill (2) || 18,145 || 74-79
|- style="background-color:#ffbbbb"
| 154 || September 19 || Mariners || 9 – 5 || Hernández (13-7) || Meyer (0-2) || || 21,171 || 74-80
|- style="background-color:#ffbbbb"
| 155 || September 21 || @ Indians || 4 – 3 || Carmona (18-8) || Blanton (14-10) || Borowski (43) || 36,016 || 74-81
|- style="background-color:#bbffbb"
| 156 || September 22 || @ Indians || 9 – 3 || Haren (15-8) || Byrd (15-7) || || 40,663 || 75-81
|- style="background-color:#ffbbbb"
| 157 || September 23 || @ Indians || 6 – 2 || Westbrook (6-9) || Braden (1-8) || Betancourt (2) || 40,250 || 75-82
|- style="background-color:#ffbbbb"
| 158 || September 25 || @ Red Sox || 7 – 3 || Schilling (9-8) || Gaudin (11-13) || || 36,708 || 75-83
|- style="background-color:#ffbbbb"
| 159 || September 26 || @ Red Sox || 11 – 6 || Timlin (2-1) || Blevins (0-1) || || 36,570 || 75-84
|- style="background-color:#ffbbbb"
| 160 || September 28 || Angels || 2 – 0 || Lackey (19-9) || Haren (15-9) || Rodríguez (39) || 32,287 || 75-85
|- style="background-color:#ffbbbb"
| 161 || September 29 || Angels || 3 – 2 || Escobar (18-7) || DiNardo (8-10) || Rodríguez (40) || 26,480 || 75-86
|- style="background-color:#bbffbb"
| 162 || September 30 || Angels || 3 – 2 || Street (5-2) || Bootcheck (3-3) || || 28,062 || 76-86

Notable games
April 5, 2007 – Mike Piazza hits a go-ahead home run to center field giving the A's a 4-3 win over the Los Angeles Angels of Anaheim. It was notable because it was his first home run of the season, his first as an Oakland Athletic, and his first ever at Angel Stadium.
April 15, 2007 – Trailing 4-2 in the bottom of the ninth with two outs against the New York Yankees, Todd Walker got a hit and Jason Kendall was walked to put two men on base. Backup Marco Scutaro who was then 1 for 20 on the season hit a home run to left field which gave the A's a remarkable 5-4 win as well as the series vs. the Yankees.
May 13, 2007 – Again trailing by two in the bottom of the ninth with two outs, the Athletics seemed to be out vs. the Cleveland Indians. However Chavez overcame a 0-2 strike count to hit a single and get on board. Milton Bradley then hit a home run to right field to tie the game. After Dan Johnson and Bobby Crosby got on base, Jack Cust, coming off a hot streak after being in the lineup for seven days at the time, hit a three-run shot to center field which gave the A's another dramatic comeback at home for a 10-7 victory.
May 18, 2007 – The first game of the season against the San Francisco Giants saw former A's pitcher Barry Zito return to Oakland and try to beat his former team. However, the A's would not allow that. Zito allowed seven runs and six hits in four-plus innings, and walked seven. The A's would pound the Giants even harder, scoring eight runs on the Giants bullpen, including a Mark Ellis grand slam for a 15-3 win.
June 2, 2007 – Joe Blanton hit nine scoreless innings for his fifth complete game against the Minnesota Twins. The Twins' pitcher Carlos Silva also pitched the entire eight innings in which the Twins were on the field. (The A's were at home, so the bottom of the ninth was not necessary.) The one run Silva allowed was the difference as the A's won 1-0.
June 4, 2007 – Mark Ellis was having a great day for the entire game vs. the Boston Red Sox. After hitting a triple in the bottom of the 2nd which gave the A's the lead, he would hit a home run in the fourth, and a double in the sixth. With a chance to hit for the cycle in the bottom of the eighth, Ellis grounded the ball into a fielder's choice and was not awarded a single, despite that no one was out as a result of the play. With the A's having a 4-2 lead it seemed like Ellis would not hit for the cycle. However, the Red Sox would tie the game in the top of the ninth, and the A's were unable to break the tie in the bottom of the inning. This was a blessing in disguise as Mark Ellis had another chance to hit for the cycle, which he did with a single to midfield. He was the sixth player in the Oakland Athletics to hit for the cycle (not including when the A's were in Philadelphia and Kansas City). Eric Chavez, who has also hit for the cycle in 2000, won the game with a solo home run in the 11th.
June 7, 2007 – Shannon Stewart broke up a hitless game for the A's in the bottom of the ninth. This spoiled Red Sox pitcher Curt Schilling's bid for his first career no-hitter. The A's however could not score, and Schilling still walked away with a complete game 1-0 shutout. It was Boston's only win of the four-game series.

Player stats

Batting

Starters by position
Note: Pos = Position; G = Games played; AB = At bats; H = Hits; Avg. = Batting average; HR = Home runs; RBI = Runs batted in

Other batters
Note: G = Games played; AB = At bats; H = Hits; Avg. = Batting average; HR = Home runs; RBI = Runs batted in

Pitching

Starting pitchers
Note: G = Games pitched; IP = Innings pitched; W = Wins; L = Losses; ERA = Earned run average; SO = Strikeouts

Other pitchers
Note: G = Games pitched; IP = Innings pitched; W = Wins; L = Losses; ERA = Earned run average; SO = Strikeouts

Relief pitchers
Note: G = Games pitched; W = Wins; L = Losses; SV = Saves; ERA = Earned run average; SO = Strikeouts

Farm system 

LEAGUE CHAMPIONS: Sacramento

References

Game Logs + Notable Games:
1st Half: Oakland Athletics Game Log on ESPN.com
2nd Half: Oakland Athletics Game Log on ESPN.com

2007 Oakland As at Baseball Reference

Oakland Athletics seasons
Oakland Athletics season
Oak